School violence includes violence between school students as well as attacks by students on school staff. It encompasses physical violence, including student-on-student fighting, corporal punishment; psychological violence such as verbal abuse, and sexual violence, including rape and sexual harassment. It includes many forms of bullying (including cyberbullying) and carrying weapons in school. It is widely believed by society to have become a serious problem in recent decades in many countries, especially where weapons such as guns or knives are involved.

Forms of school violence and different types of bullying 
School violence is widespread. It occurs in all countries and affects a significant number of children and adolescents. It is mostly perpetrated by peers but, in some cases, is perpetrated by teachers and other school staff. School violence includes physical, psychological and sexual violence.

Bullying 
Bullying is characterized by aggressive behavior that involves unwanted, negative actions, is repeated over time, and an imbalance of power or strength between the perpetrator or perpetrators and the victim. It is distinct from more common one-off conflicts among peers.

Different types of bullying include physical, psychological, sexual, and cyber-bullying.

 Physical bullying includes repeated aggression such as being hit, hurt, kicked, pushed, shoved around or locked indoors, having things stolen, having personal belongings taken away or destroyed, or being forced to do things. It is different from other forms of physical violence such as physical fights and physical attacks.
 Psychological bullying includes verbal abuse, emotional abuse and social exclusion and refers to being called mean names, being teased in an unpleasant way, being left out of activities on purpose, excluded or completely ignored, and being the subject of lies or rumors.
 Sexual bullying refers to being made fun of with sexual jokes, comments or gestures.
 Cyber bullying includes being bullied by messages, i.e. someone sending mean instant messages, postings, emails and text messages or creating a website that makes fun of a student or by pictures, i.e. someone taking and posting online unflattering or inappropriate pictures of a student without permission; it also refers to being treated in a hurtful or nasty way by mobile phones (texts, calls, video clips) or online (email, instant messaging, social networking, chatrooms) and online hurtful behaviour.

Physical fights 
According to the Global School-based Student Health Survey (GSSHS), a physical fight “occurs when two students of about the same strength or power choose to fight each other” and therefore is a form of physical violence between peers. The Health Behavior in School-aged Children (HBSC) does not refer specifically to school-related violence or to violence between peers, as it can occur between a student and “a total stranger, a parent of other adult family member, a brother or sister, a boyfriend or girlfriend or date, a friend or someone known by the student”.

Sexual violence 
According to Demographic and Health Survey (DHS), sexual violence is forced sexual intercourse or any other sexual acts against one's will. Violence Against Children Survey (VACS) defines it as completed non-consensual sex acts (such as rape), attempted non-consensual sex acts, abusive sexual contact (such as unwanted touching), and non-contact sexual abuse (such as threatened sexual violence, exhibitionism, and verbal sexual harassment).

Physical violence perpetrated by teachers 
This is defined as the intentional use of physical force with the potential to cause death, disability, injury or harm, regardless of whether it is used as a form of punishment.

Corporal punishment perpetrated by teachers 
In school, corporal punishment is defined as any punishment in which physical force is used and intended to cause some degree of pain or discomfort. Most involves hitting children, with the hand or with an implement, but it can also involve kicking, shaking, throwing or scratching children.

Risk factors

Internalizing and externalizing behaviors

A distinction is made between internalizing and externalizing behavior. Internalizing behaviors reflect withdrawal, inhibition, anxiety, and/or depression. Internalizing behavior has been found in some cases of youth violence although in some youth, depression is associated with substance abuse. Because they rarely act out, students with internalizing problems are often overlooked by school personnel. Externalizing behaviors refer to delinquent activities, aggression, and hyperactivity. Unlike internalizing behaviors, externalizing behaviors include, or are directly linked to, violent episodes. Violent behaviors such as punching and kicking are often learned from observing others. Just as externalizing behaviors are observed outside of school, such behaviors also observed in schools.

Other individual factors

A number of other individual factors are associated with higher levels of aggressiveness. Compared to children whose antisocial conduct begins in adolescence, early starters have a worse prognosis in terms of future aggression and other antisocial activities. Lower IQ is related to higher levels of aggression. Other findings indicate that in boys early problematic motor skills, attention difficulties, and reading problems predict later persistent antisocial conduct.

Home environment
The home environment is thought to contribute to school violence. The Constitutional Rights Foundation suggests long-term exposure to gun violence, parental alcoholism, domestic violence, physical abuse of the child, and child sexual abuse teaches children that criminal and violent activities are acceptable. Harsh parental discipline is associated with higher levels of aggressiveness in youth. There is some evidence indicating that exposure to television violence and, to a lesser extent, violent video games is related to increased aggressiveness in children, which, in turn, may carry over into school.

Straus adduced evidence for the view that exposure to parental corporal punishment increases the risk of aggressive conduct in children and adolescents. Straus's findings have been contested by Larzelere and Baum rind. A meta-analysis of the vast literature on corporal punishment, however, indicates that corporal punishment is related to poorer outcomes in children and youth. The methodologically soundest studies indicate "positive, moderately sized associations between parental corporal punishment and children's aggression." Gershoff found that the trajectory of mean effect sizes (the size of the effect of corporal punishment on children's problem behavior) was curvilinear with the largest mean effect size in middle school (M = 0.55; on average the mean of corporal punishment group was more than half a standard deviation higher than the mean of the non-punishment group) and slightly smaller effect sizes in elementary school (M = 0.43) and high school (M = 0.45).

Gerald Patterson's social interactional model, which involves the mother's application and the child's counter-application of coercive behaviors, also explains the development of aggressive conduct in the child. In this context, coercive behaviors include behaviors that are ordinarily punishing (e.g., whining, yelling, hitting, etc.). Abusive home environments can inhibit the growth of social cognitive skills needed, for example, to understand the intentions of others.  Short-term longitudinal evidence is consistent with the view that a lack of social cognitive skills mediates the link between harsh parental discipline and aggressive conduct in kindergarten. Longer-term, follow-up research with the same children suggests that partial mediating effects last until third and fourth grade. Hirschi's (1969) control theory advances the view that children with weak affective ties to parents and school are at increased risk of engaging in delinquent and violent behavior in and out of school. Hirschi's cross-sectional data from northern California high-school students are largely consistent with this view.  Findings from case-control and longitudinal studies are also consistent with this view.

Neighbourhood environment
Neighbourhoods and communities provide the context for school violence. Communities with high rates of crime and drug use teach youth the violent behaviors that are carried into schools. Children in violent neighborhoods tend to perceive that their communities are risky, and that these feelings of vulnerability carry over to the school environment. Dilapidated housing in the neighbourhood of the school has been found to be associated with school violence. Teacher assault was more likely to occur in schools located in high-crime neighbourhoods. Exposure to deviant peers is a risk factor for high levels of aggressivity. Research has shown that poverty and high population densities are associated with higher rates of school violence. Controlled longitudinal research indicates that children's exposure to community violence during the early elementary school years increases the risk of aggression later in elementary school, as reported by teachers and classmates. Other, well controlled longitudinal research that utilized propensity score matching indicates that exposure to gun violence in early adolescence is related to the initiation of serious physical violence in later adolescence. Neighbourhood gangs are thought to contribute to dangerous school environments. Gangs use the social environment of the school to recruit members and interact with opposing groups, with gang violence carrying over from neighbourhoods into some schools. Alternatively, many children who grow up in violent neighborhoods learn to deliberately find and make "street-oriented" friends as an instrumental tactic used to avoid being victimized. Without the threat of violence, children more commonly develop friendships based on homophily, or shared traits.

School environment
Recent research has linked the school environment to school violence.  Teacher assaults are associated with a higher percentage male faculty, a higher proportion of male students, and a higher proportion of students receiving free or reduced cost lunch (an indicator of poverty). In general, a large male population, higher grade levels, a history of high levels of disciplinary problems in the school, high student to teacher ratios, and an urban location are related to violence in schools. In students, academic performance is inversely related to antisocial conduct.  The research by Hirschi and others, cited above in the section on the home environment, is also consistent with the view that lack of attachment to school is associated with increased risk of antisocial conduct.

Prevention and intervention
The goal of prevention and intervention strategies is to stop school violence from occurring. According to the CDC, there are at least four levels at which violence-prevention programs can act: at the level of society in general, the school community, the family, and the individual.

Society-level prevention strategies aim to change social and cultural conditions in order to reduce violence regardless of where the violence occurs. Examples include reducing media violence, reshaping social norms, and restructuring educational systems. The strategies are rarely used and difficult to implement.
Now Is The Time is a federal initiative developed in 2013 in response to the growing number of gun related school violence incidents. The initiative will provide funding and resources to schools in an effort to reduce gun violence in schools. Funding will be provided for implementation of school interventions and training teachers and staff, programs that will support the mental and physical health of students, conflict resolution programs to reduce further school violence, and restoration of school environment after a violent incident.
School-wide strategies are designed to modify the school characteristics that are associated with violence. An avenue of psychological research is the reduction of violence and incivility, particularly the development of interventions at the level of the school. The CDC suggests schools promote classroom management techniques, cooperative learning, and close student supervision. At the elementary school level, the group behavioral intervention known as the Good Behavior Game helps reduce classroom disruption and promotes prosocial classroom interactions. There is some evidence that the Second Step curriculum, which is concerned with promoting impulse control and empathy among second and third graders, produces reductions in physically aggressive behavior. Other school-wide strategies are aimed at reducing or eliminating bullying and organizing the local police to better combat gang violence.
The implementation of school-wide early-warning systems, the school equivalent of a DEW Line-like surveillance operation designed to "prevent the worst cases of school violence," has been problematic. Recent developments in early threat assessment, however, show promise. Violence-prevention efforts can also be usefully directed at developing anti-bullying programs, helping teachers with classroom-management strategies, applying behavioral strategies such as the Good Behavior Game, implementing curricular innovations such as the Second Step syllabus, developing programs to strengthen families (see below), and implementing programs aimed at enhancing the social and academic skills of at-risk students (see below).
 Teachers are the professional group who works directly where school bullying takes place and who spends the most time with both bullies, victims and bystanders. Thus, whether and how teachers intervene in the case of bullying is of great importance. Research has shown that teachers prefer authority-based interventions towards bullies but seem to neglect to support the victims.  Unfortunately, teacher training curricula tend not to include preventive and interventive skills regarding school violence. It has been shown that teachers who set limits and make it clear that previous behavior is in no way acceptable, and also involve the school administration, can reduce problematic behavior. Discussing the issue with the entire class can also lead to positive preventive effects.

Not only does physical violence in schools affect its victims, it also affects the witnesses. In elementary schools, young students tend to copy their peers actions in schools, which may lead to more physical harm towards other students.

Some intervention programs are aimed at improving family relationships. There is some evidence that such intervention strategies have modest effects on the behavior of children in the short and long term. Patterson's home intervention program involving mothers has been shown to reduce aggressive conduct in children. An important question concerns the extent to which the influence of the program carries over into the child's conduct in school.
Some prevention and intervention programs focus on individual-level strategies. These programs are aimed at students who exhibit aggression and violent behaviors or are at risk for engaging in such behaviors. Some programs include conflict resolution and team problem-solving. Other programs teach students social skills. The Conduct Problems Prevention Research Group, while developing and implementing a universal anti-aggression component for all elementary school children, also developed and implemented a separate social-skills and academic tutoring component that targets children who are the most at risk for engaging in aggressive behavior.
 Bullying prevention programs such as Olweus provides materials for educators that will train them on how to mediate a bullying situation as well as procedures to take if a child is suicidal.

Challenges in measuring violence in schools 
Research on violence affecting children in schools is challenging for a variety of reasons.

Methodological issues 
When trying to measure the scope of violence in schools and to find out about the types of violence experienced by students, some key issues include: from what categories of the school community to collect the data; what data should be collected from each categories; and using which methods. For example, should there be studies or surveys where researchers ask students directly about violence in school, through self-reports about the violence they experienced as targets or perpetrators? Or should they be asked about incidents of violence that they have witnessed as bystanders? Should any of these questions be asked via self-administered questionnaires or questionnaires administered by researchers in schools? Does it make more sense to collect this data outside of schools, for example, through household surveys? Or through online surveys where students have access to the internet? Or is it better to rely on mechanisms for reporting incidents of violence in educational institutions when they are available, either in the schools themselves or outside schools (governmental hotlines, internet-based reporting systems, police and justice sectors, etc.)? What questions can be asked of children, using terminology that is easy to understand, age-appropriate and culturally sensitive?

Legal and ethical issues 
In most countries there are strict rules related to research involving children, as they are under the age of consent. Therefore, requesting informed consent from the children in a study involves their parents and guardians. Asking children about violence, and particularly violence they have experienced themselves, can be traumatic. Finally, researching issues related to sexual orientation and gender identity/orientation in education and in relation to children has additional challenges. In some contexts it is not legal to discuss these issues either in schools or even outside of schools. Where it is legal, it may be considered as a very sensitive topic to be discussed with children and young people. Asking children and young people questions related to their sexual orientation and gender identity in the school setting is ethically questionable, as it could embarrass them and expose them to stigma and discrimination, unless questions are asked in strict confidence and anonymity is granted by independent researchers external to schools.

See also

Sources

References

External links

U.S. Bureau of Justice Statistics. (2009).Indicators of school crime and safety 2009.
Centers for Disease Control and Prevention. (2010). Understanding school violence: Fact sheet.
Centers for Disease Control and Prevention. (2009). Youth violence: National and state statistics at a glance.
Schonfeld I.S. (2006). School Violence. In E.K. Kelloway, J. Barling, & J.J. Hurrell, Jr. (eds.). Handbook of workplace violence (pp. 169–229). Thousand Oaks, California, USA: Sage Publications.
Using Canines to Address School Violence (FBI)
 http://www.violencepreventionworks.org/public/index.page

 
Education issues
Crimes
Violence
School bullying
Attacks on schools